Mohd Fairul Azwan Shahrullai (born 20 March 1987 in Selangor) is a Malaysian goalkeeper currently playing for FELDA United F.C. in Malaysia Super League.

Career

Selangor President Cup Team
Fairul Azwan started playing for the Selangor President's Cup Team in 2008. He was the team's main goalkeeper and helped Selangor to win President's Cup in the 2007-08 President Cup Malaysia defeated Perak President's Cup Team 1-0 in final.

Selangor FA
Then, he promoted to Selangor FA from Selangor President's Cup Team.

References
 Profile Fairul Azwan

External links
 Story Fairul Azwan

Selangor FA players
Malaysian footballers
Living people
1987 births
People from Selangor
Felda United F.C. players
Malaysia Super League players
Association football goalkeepers
Petaling Jaya Rangers F.C. players